Flordeliza Sanchez-Gutierrez (born March 10, 1975), better known by her screen name Glydel Mercado, is a Filipino actress and politician. She won a number of Best Supporting Actress awards her role in 1999 film Sidhi.

Career
She appeared in movies such as Alyas Baby Chino (1989), Teenage Mama (1993), Bikini Watch (1995), Anak ng Yakuza (1997) and Ambisyosa (1997) with Tonton Gutierrez, Emilio Garcia, Rita Magdalena, Roy Rodrigo and Ronaldo Valdez. She would do more acclaimed films such as Sidhi with Nora Aunor and Albert Martinez (1998) and Azucena with Alessandra De Rossi in 2000 Sana Totoo Na in 2002.

In 2008, she played as Marlina in drama film Lukaret, a story of a woman whose struggle to keep her sanity becomes complicated when she gets obsessed with a young man's affection that results in a series of gruesome murders.

She was included in the cast in GMA Network's Babangon Ako't Dudurugin Kita (2008) with Dina Bonnevie and Gagambino (2008) with Dennis Trillo. She was also in TV5's Isang Dakot na Luha (2012) starring Danita Paner, Jay Manalo and Alice Dixson.

During 2012, Mercado officially signed an exclusive television contract with GMA Network.

After seven years on GMA Network, she returned to ABS-CBN to play an antagonist role in Kadenang Ginto.

In 2021, after finishing Bagong Umaga on ABS-CBN, she returned to GMA-7 in the defunct teleserye The World Between Us as a guest cast.

Personal life
She is married to actor Tonton Gutierrez on March 15, 2004, at the Sanctuario de San Antonio Parish, Forbes Park, Makati. She is a mother of two, Aneeza and Aneeka.

Filmography

Television

Film

Awards and nominations

Discography

Albums

References

1975 births
Living people
Glydel
Actresses from Negros Oriental
People from Dumaguete
That's Entertainment (Philippine TV series)
That's Entertainment Friday Group Members
GMA Network personalities
ABS-CBN personalities